Buyu Balease (also known as Baliase, or Gunung Baleaseis) is a mountain on Sulawesi island, located north-east of Palopo city, in South Sulawesi, Indonesia.

See also 

 List of volcanoes in Indonesia
 List of Ultras of Malay Archipelago

References 

Buyu Balease
Landforms of South Sulawesi